Star Awards 2006 is a television awards ceremony telecast in 2006 as part of the annual Star Awards organised by MediaCorp for MediaCorp TV Channel 8. The ceremony, alongside the Walk-of-fame and the Post-show party, were held on 10 December 2006 in Singapore and was hosted by Guo Liang and Taiwanese host Patty Hou.

This year saw precedents in Star Awards history: it was the second ceremony in Star Awards history that the ceremony was held outside the Caldecott Hill since the 1996 ceremony, where it was instead held on a pub at St James Power Station (a pub near VivoCity); it was also the first Star Awards ceremony (of the only seven) to be awarded the Best Variety Special in 2007.

Winners and nominees
Unless otherwise stated, winners are listed first, highlighted in boldface.

Backstage Achievement Awards Ceremony
As like preceding ceremonies, Professional and Technical Awards were presented before the main ceremony via a clip montage due to time constraints. The lists of winners are only reflected in the table.
{| class=wikitable
|-
| valign="top" width="50%"|
 
Chong Liung Man 张龙敏  – C.I.D. 刑警2人组
| valign="top" width="50%"|
 
Ang Eng Tee 洪荣狄  – The Shining Star 星闪闪
Ng Kah Huay 黄佳华 and Goh Chwee Chwee 吴翠翠  – Family Matters 法庭俏佳人
|-
| valign="top" width="50%"|
 Ahyak Yahya  – SuperBand 非常SuperBand| valign="top" width="50%"|
 Annie Chua Yi Jun 蔡宜君  – Ren Ci Charity Show 2006 仁心慈爱照万千2006|-
| valign="top" width="50%"|
 Jon Li 李尊  – Campus SuperStar 校园SuperStar 2006| valign="top" width="50%"|
 Lim Swee Shia 林瑞霞  – Its Showtime! 全民创意争霸赛|-
| valign="top" width="50%"|
 Kerry Soh 苏丽䣐  – Campus SuperStar (Grand Finals) 校园SuperStar 2006 总决赛| valign="top" width="50%"|
 Teo Kim Kee 张琴棋  – Never Say Die (Finals) 永不言败 大决赛|-
| colspan="2" valign="top" width="50%"|
 Ng Kee Haur 黄志豪  – CNY Temple Visits 农历新年与庙会|-
| colspan="2" valign="top" width="50%"|
 Focus 焦点  – Gao Xingjian Experience in Paris 高行健巴黎接触'|}

Main Ceremony

Special Award
All Time Favourite Award
This award is a special achievement award given out to artiste(s) who have achieved a maximum of 10 popularity awards over 10 years. The award will not be presented in 2007, as there are no recipients with ten Top 10 Most Popular Male or Female Artistes award wins to allow the award to be presented that year.

Viewership Awards

Awards eligible for voting

Top 10 Most Popular Artiste

Presenters and performers
The following individuals presented awards or performed musical numbers.

 Television spinoff 
An eight-week half-hour series, titled Star Awards Up-close premiered on Tuesdays 8:30 pm from 17 October until 5 December, focusing on the award show leading up to the actual show on 10 December, along with presentation of 'side awards' (not an actual award). The weekly popularity results for the Top 10 Most Popular Artistes were announced as well. The series was hosted by Dasmond Koh and Christina Lin.

Ceremony
Professional and Technical Awards were presented before the main ceremony via a clip montage due to time constraints. The main awards were presented during the ceremony.

 Criticism 
The ceremony for Star Awards 2006 received mixed reception, however, criticisms were surfaced from the technical, camera and backstage crew, ranging from technical problems (i.e. lack of sound control, or display glitches) to management (i.e. time management and area allocation, the latter did receive complaints from the audiences watching from the mosh pit and free standing areas).

St. James Power Station, which was selected as the venue, was also criticised by viewers, citing that the venue was too small to host award ceremonies as artistes and audience were either squeezed in or forced out of the venue due to limited space. However, four other venues outside the MediaCorp Studios at Caldecott studios (1996's World Trade Centre, 2010–11's Resorts World Sentosa, 2012–13's Marina Bay Sands and 2014's Suntec Singapore Convention and Exhibition Centre) were much more favourable in hosting live performances since, specifically Star Awards.

The nominations also saw controversies whereas the potential artistes, notably Aileen Tan, who had two leading roles, failed to receive nominations for both Best Actresses and the Top 10 Most Favourite artiste, in the place for singers Kelvin Tan, Candyce Toh and Chew Sin Huey, all of which were nominated for the first time. This led to outrage by Tan's detractors, who claimed that she has taken on stereotype roles, particular that of fierce, angry and constantly screaming characters too many times, which could have impacted her nomination chances.

During the award ceremony, both the acceptance speeches for Tay Ping Hui (Tay unnecessarily extended for an extended duration, causing host Bryan Wong was unable to finish his speech on time) and Huang Yiliang (Huang making remarks unsuitable for audiences) had resulted in complaints lodged by the viewers. The guest presenters were also heavily criticised in terms on jokes, leading MediaCorp to force out fans from entering the pub.

The adjustment of the ratio for the "Top 10 Most Favourite Artistes" received mixed reviews about the 50% allocation of the final results, which was done in August 2006 by a survey of about 600 Singaporeans. The reviews ranging from advantages assumed by newer artistes, but also a bit of criticism when rumours were spread on why Kelvin Tan Wei Lian lost by some votes in the weekly survey results. Despite this, the 50% allocation would later be returned in Star Awards 2018'', and revised where it was done on a derivation of 1,000 votes.

Awards

External links
Star Awards 2006 Official Website
Trailers and popularity Award's weekly results (in video)
Nominees for Non-audience voting awards such as Best Actor and Best Actress (English Edition)
Nominees for Non-audience voting awards such as Best Actor and Best Actress (Chinese Edition)
Nominees of Popularity Award (English Edition)
Nominees of Popularity Award (Chinese Edition)
Interview with some Stars
Star Awards Surprises

2006 television awards
Star Awards